Fucose-1-phosphate guanylyltransferase is an enzyme that in humans is encoded by the FPGT gene.

L-fucose is a key sugar in glycoproteins and other complex carbohydrates since it may be involved in many of the functional roles of these macromolecules, such as in cell–cell recognition. The fucosyl donor for these fucosylated oligosaccharides is GDP-beta-L-fucose. 

There are two alternate pathways for the biosynthesis of GDP-fucose; the major pathway converts GDP-alpha-D-mannose to GDP-beta-L-fucose. The protein encoded by this gene participates in an alternate pathway that is present in certain mammalian tissues, such as liver and kidney, and appears to function as a salvage pathway to reutilize L-fucose arising from the turnover of glycoproteins and glycolipids. 

This pathway involves the phosphorylation of L-fucose to form beta-L-fucose-1-phosphate, and then condensation of the beta-L-fucose-1-phosphate with GTP by fucose-1-phosphate guanylyltransferase to form GDP-beta-L-fucose.

References

Further reading